Alan Sutton (fl. 1974–2010) is an English publisher.

Alan or Allan Sutton may also refer to:

Alan Sutton Publishing company
Allan Sutton (fl. 1347), MP